Jai Powell Lucas (born December 5, 1988) is an assistant coach for the Duke Blue Devils men's basketball team and a former American professional basketball player, as well as a former NCAA college basketball player for the Texas Longhorns.

Playing career
As a 5’10” point guard in the Houston suburb of Bellaire, Lucas was a McDonald's All American and was rated 20th by ESPN in the high school class of 2007. Lucas was initially recruited to play for the University of Florida. Lucas averaged 8.5 points and 2.3 assists per game during his freshman year. Prior to his second season with the Gators, Lucas announced he would transfer and, as per NCAA rules at the time, would sit out the 2008-9 season.  A month later, he announced he would next play for the University of Texas.   He played two seasons for the Longhorns, averaging about 3 points and 1 assist per game. 

Lucas’s pro career lasted from 2011 and 2013 and included one season with BK Valmiera, then stints in the G League with the Idaho Stampede,  the Sioux Falls Skyforce, and the Canton Charge.

Coaching
In August 2013, almost immediately after leaving his last pro team, the Texas Longhorns hired Lucas as an assistant coach on the staff of Rick Barnes. Lucas assisted in all internal operations of the basketball program. Lucas was retained by Barnes' successor, Shaka Smart, in 2015. 

Lucas was hired by John Calipari in 2020 to be a special assistant and lead recruiter at the University of Kentucky.  During the 2021-22 season at Kentucky, Lucas was rated the second best recruiter in the country, behind only Jon Scheyer, who was the associate head coach at Duke .

After Scheyer took over as the Duke head coach at the end of the 2021-22 season, he hired Lucas as an assistant coach, the first Duke assistant who hadn’t played for the Blue Devils in 30 years.

Family
Lucas is from a well-known basketball family. His father, John Lucas II, was an All-American at Maryland who went on to a 14-year career in the NBA and was later head coach of three NBA teams. His older brother, John Lucas III, was a star at Baylor and Oklahoma State who played two seasons for the Houston Rockets, then continued his career in Italy, and most recently played for the Minnesota Timberwolves.

References

External links
Texas Longhorns bio
NBA D-League Profile

1988 births
Living people
American expatriate basketball people in Latvia
Basketball coaches from Texas
Canton Charge players
Florida Gators men's basketball players
Idaho Stampede players
McDonald's High School All-Americans
Parade High School All-Americans (boys' basketball)
Point guards
Sioux Falls Skyforce players
Basketball players from Houston
Texas Longhorns men's basketball coaches
Texas Longhorns men's basketball players
American men's basketball players
Kentucky Wildcats men's basketball coaches